Cedar Springs and Cedar Spring may refer to:

United States
Cedar Springs, Arizona
Cedar Spring, Kentucky
Cedar Springs, Georgia
Cedar Springs, Michigan
Cedar Springs, Missouri
Cedar Springs, Ohio
Cedar Springs, Texas
Cedar Springs Historic District, South Carolina

Canada
Cedar Springs, Chatham-Kent, Ontario
Cedar Springs, Halton Regional Municipality, Ontario